Qingdao Liming (Simplified Chinese: 青岛黎明) is a semi-professional football club based in Jimo after move to Qingdao. The club was founded in 1998, play in the Chinese Yi League, but absent in season 2008.

Club constructed their  grass training field on the east side of Jimo, Shandong gongquan reservoir in 2000.

External links
 https://web.archive.org/web/20070528163826/http://www.liming-football.com/

Defunct football clubs in China
Football clubs in China
Sport in Qingdao
1998 establishments in China